Phalaenopsis micholitzii is a species of plant in the family Orchidaceae. It is endemic to the Zamboanga peninsula in the island of Mindanao, Philippines.

Description
The small, epiphytic plants have fleshy leaves. The fleshy, cupped, 5 to 6 cm wide flowers are not fragrant, or only slightly fragrant, and they last 25 to 35 days. The floral colouration may be white, cream-coloured, yellowish or greenish.

Ecology
Its natural habitat is subtropical or tropical moist lowland forests.

Etymology
The specific epithet is refers to the German orchid collector Wilhelm Micholitz, who worked as a plant collector for Henry Frederick Conrad Sander.

Taxonomy
There appears to be conflicting information about the correct author of the taxon. The International Plant Names Index lists three entires of Phalaenopsis micholitzii. Several sources indicate, that Rolfe is the author, while others name Sander ex H.J.Veitch as the taxon authors.

Conservation
It is threatened by habitat loss and overcollection.

Cytology
The diploid chromosome count of this species is 2n = 38.

Horticulture
This species is rarely cultivated. It has been reported to be very slow growing.

References

micholitzii
Critically endangered plants
Endemic orchids of the Philippines
Flora of Mindanao
Taxonomy articles created by Polbot